The 2016 UNCAF Women's Interclub Championship was the first edition of the UNCAF Women's Interclub Championship, Central America's women's club football championship organized by UNCAF. The tournament was played in San José, Costa Rica between 24 and 29 May 2016.

In the final, Moravia from Costa Rica defeated Unifut from Guatemala to win the inaugural title. All games were 80 minutes in duration.

Teams
A total of six teams from four of the seven UNCAF associations entered the tournament.

Venues
All matches were played at the Estadio Ernesto Rohrmoser (artificial turf) in San José.

Group stage
The six teams were divided into two groups of three. The group winners and runners-up advanced to the semi-finals.

All times were local, CST (UTC−6).

Group A

Group B

Knockout stage

Bracket

Semi-finals

Final

Top scorers

Awards

References

External links
Fútbol Femenino – Torneo Interclubes, UNCAFut.com
Official Facebook page

2016
2016 in women's association football
2016 in Central American football
May 2016 sports events in North America
International association football competitions hosted by Costa Rica